The 1994 WTA German Open was a professional women's tennis tournament played on outdoor clay courts in Berlin, Germany. It was part of the Tier I category of the 1994 WTA Tour. It was the 25th edition of the tournament and was held from 9 May through 15 May 1994. Steffi Graf won the singles title and earned $150,000 first-prize money..

Finals

Singles
 Steffi Graf defeated  Brenda Schultz 7–6(8–6), 6–4

Doubles
 Gigi Fernández /  Natalia Zvereva defeated  Graham /  Brenda Schultz 6–1, 6–3

Prize money

External links
 ITF tournament edition details
 Tournament draws

WTA German Open
WTA German Open
May 1994 sports events in Europe
1994 in German tennis